Robert Boston (1836 – April 12, 1922) was a Canadian politician and farmer. Born in Melrose, Upper Canada, Boston was acclaimed to the House of Commons of Canada in an 1893 by-election upon the death of James Armstrong as a Member of the Liberal Party to represent the riding of Middlesex South. He lost the election in 1904 in the riding of Middlesex North to Valentine Ratz, both of whom were Liberal candidates.

External links
 

1836 births
1922 deaths
Place of death missing
Liberal Party of Canada MPs
Members of the House of Commons of Canada from Ontario